Bottersnikes and Gumbles is an animated television series which first aired on 7TWO in Australia and CBBC in the United Kingdom. The cast includes Jason Callender, Richard Grieve, Jeff Rawle, Kathryn Drysdale and Miriam Margolyes. It was released on Netflix in North America on 19 August 2016 but was re-dubbed with American accents.

History 
Bottersnikes and Gumbles was in development as early as 2012 by Mighty Nice and Cheeky Little Media. The TV series is based on the Australian children's book series of the same name written by S. A. Wakefield. In early 2015, the streaming video service Netflix announced it had acquired the rights to the series and it was released as 52 eleven-minute episodes. It later aired on 7TWO in Australia  on 18 December 2015 until 22 January 2016 and CBBC in the UK in 2016. It is pitched at "6 to 9 year old boys and girls." Patrick Egerton, the producer and Cheeky Little Media CEO, described how the "books contain such a rich, distinctive world and made an indelible mark on my mind as a kid. With the CG tools and skills now available, we knew the timing was right to develop the property for TV and really do it justice."

According to Animation World Network (AWN) staff editor it "follows the adventures of three young Gumbles, Tink, Bounce and Willi, who love nothing better than to 'gumble' all day long. Endless battles ensue involving plenty of stealth, trickery, daring rescues and narrow escapes as the Gumbles try to outwit the Bottersnikes in every episode." The cast includes Richard Grieve, Jeff Rawle, Kathryn Drysdale and Miriam Margolyes. It was released on Netflix in North America on 19 August 2016; which was re-dubbed with American accents.

Sean O'Grady of The Independent felt the series based on Wakefield's books "are better adapted than most other exercises of this nature. Bottersnikes are superbly rendered lizardly creatures that are the bogeymen of the show, a bit like Momentum in the Labour Party; Gumbles are apparently normal, but hopelessly optimistic, like Brexiteers. The stories are short and sweet and the attention to detail is remarkable." The show received a Pulcinella Award for 'Best Kids TV Series' at the international animation festival, Cartoons on the Bay, in Venice and was nominated for 'Most Outstanding Children's program' at the 2016 Logie Awards.

Cast

UK version
Jason Callender as Tink
Kathryn Drysdale as Bounce and Merri
Akiya Henry as Willi and Jolli
Richard Grieve as Toot, King Snike and Glob
Jeff Rawle as Happi and Rock
Miriam Margolyes as Weathersnike
Alex Babic as Chank and Gubbo
Gem Knight as Float and Snorg

US version
Robbie Daymond as Tink
Erica Lindbeck as Bounce
Tara Sands as Willi
Hal Dibble as Happi
David W. Collins as Toot, Sammi and Rock
Nile Kliewer as Merri
Karen Strassman as Float and Jolli
Ray Chase as King Snike
Kyle McCarley as Chank
Barbara Goodson as Weathersnike
Kyle Hebert as Gubbo
Keith Silverstein as Smiggles
Jessica Gee as Glob
Laila Berzins as Snorg
Kaiji Tang as Burples and Angry Strawberry

References

External links
 Bottersnikes and Gumbles - CBBC
 
 
 Cheeky Little Media

7two original programming
Australian children's animated comedy television series
2010s Australian animated television series
2010s British animated television series
2010s British children's television series
2015 Australian television series debuts
BBC children's television shows
British children's animated comedy television series
English-language Netflix original programming
Australian computer-animated television series
British computer-animated television series